Vladimir Vasilyev (born 11 August 1969) is a Russian rally raid driver in the car category. He won the FIA World Cup for Cross-Country Rallies in 2014 and the FIA World Cup for Cross-Country Bajas in 2020. He also won the 2017 Africa Eco Race.

References

1969 births
Living people
People from Tver
Russian rally drivers
Dakar Rally drivers